Ingo Kirsch is a retired East German slalom canoeist who competed in the early-to-mid 1960s. He won a bronze medal in the C-1 event at the 1961 ICF Canoe Slalom World Championships in Hainsberg.

References

German male canoeists
Living people
Year of birth missing (living people)
Medalists at the ICF Canoe Slalom World Championships